Mount Wellington (officially kunanyi / Mount Wellington) is a mountain in the southeast of Tasmania, Australia. It is the summit of the Wellington Range and is within Wellington Park reserve. Hobart, Tasmania's capital city, is located at the foot of the mountain.

From Hobart, the most distinctive feature of Mount Wellington is the cliff of dolerite columns known as the Organ Pipes.

Geology

The low-lying areas and foothills of Mount Wellington were formed by slow geological upsurge when the whole Hobart area was a low-lying cold shallow seabed. The upper reaches of the mountain were formed more violently, as a Sill with a tabular mass of igneous rock that has been intruded laterally between layers of older rock pushing upwards by upsurges of molten rock as the Australian continental shelf tore away from Antarctica, and separated from Gondwana over 40 million years ago. A small volcanic vent was active about 300m south of the Pinnacle during Tertiary times, between 50 and 10 million years ago.

Indigenous history
The Aboriginal nations people of the area referred to Mount Wellington as kunanyi (or ungyhaletta), poorawetter (or pooranetere, also pooranetteri).

The indigenous people of Tasmania referred to it as kunanyi. The Palawa, the surviving descendants of the original indigenous Tasmanians, tend to prefer the latter name. In 2013, the Tasmanian government announced a dual naming policy and "kunanyi / Mount Wellington" was named as one of the inaugural dual named geographic features.

European history
The first recorded European in the area Abel Tasman probably did not see the mountain in 1642, as his ship was quite a distance out to sea as he sailed up the South East coast of the island – coming closer in near present-day North and Marion Bays.

No other Europeans visited Tasmania until the late eighteenth century, when several visited southern Tasmania (then referred to as Van Diemens Land) including Frenchman Marion du Fresne (1772), Englishmen Tobias Furneaux (1773), James Cook (1777) and William Bligh (1788 and 1792), and Frenchman Bruni d'Entrecasteaux (1792–93). In 1793 Commodore John Hayes arrived at the Derwent River, naming the mountain Skiddaw, after the mountain in the Lake District, although this name never gained popularity.

In 1798 Matthew Flinders and George Bass circumnavigated the island. Whilst they were resting in the area Flinders named the river the Derwent River (the name John Hayes had given only to the upper part of the river), Flinders referred to the mountain as "Table Mountain" (the name given to it by Bond and Bligh – young Matthew Flinders was with them in 1791) for its similarity in appearance to Table Mountain in South Africa. Bruni d'Entrecasteaux's men were the first European to sail up the river and chart it. Later Nicholas Baudin led another French expedition in 1802, and whilst sheltering in the Derwent River (which they referred to as "River du Nord" – the name d'Entrecasteaux had given to it) Baudin also referred to the mountain as "Montagne du Plateau" (also named by d'Entrecasteaux). However, the British first settled in the Hobart area in 1804, resulting in Flinders' name of "Table Mountain" becoming more popular. Table Mountain remained its common name until in 1832 it was decided to rename the mountain in honour of the Duke of Wellington who, with Gebhard Leberecht von Blücher finally defeated Napoleon at the Battle of Waterloo in present-day Belgium on 18 June 1815.

In February 1836, Charles Darwin visited Hobart Town and climbed Mount Wellington. In his book The Voyage of the Beagle, Darwin described the mountain thus:
"... In many parts the Eucalypti grew to a great size, and composed a noble forest. In some of the dampest ravines, tree-ferns flourished in an extraordinary manner; I saw one which must have been at least twenty feet high to the base of the fronds, and was in girth exactly six feet. The fronds forming the most elegant parasols, produced a gloomy shade, like that of the first hour of the night. The summit of the mountain is broad and flat, and is composed of huge angular masses of naked greenstone. The day was splendidly clear, and we enjoyed a most extensive view; to the north, the country appeared a mass of wooded mountains, of about the same height with that on which we were standing, and with an equally tame outline: to the south the broken land and water, forming many intricate bays, was mapped with clearness before us. ..."

The first weather station was set up on Mount Wellington in 1895 by Clement Lindley Wragge.

Mount Wellington has played host to some notorious characters over time, especially the bushranger John "Rocky" Whelan, who murdered several travelers in the middle of the 19th century. The cave where he lived is known appropriately as "Rocky Whelan's Cave", and is an easy walk from the Springs.

Development

Throughout the 19th and into the 20th centuries, the mountain was a popular day-resort for residents of Hobart. To that end, many excursion huts were built over the lower slopes of the mountain. However, none of these early huts survive as they were all destroyed during the disastrous bushfires of 1967, though modern huts are open to the public at the Springs, the Pinnacle, the Chalet – a picnic spot about halfway between the Springs and the Pinnacle – and elsewhere. Many of the more remote huts have suffered from vandalism, and some are virtually derelict.

The road to the summit was constructed in the early 1930s as a relief scheme for the unemployed, an idea initiated by Albert Ogilvie, the premier of Tasmania of the day. While the road is officially known as the Pinnacle Drive, it was, for some time, also widely known among residents of Hobart as "Ogilvie's Scar" because at the time it was constructed "the Mountain" was heavily logged and almost bare, and the road was an all-too-obvious scar across the already denuded mountain. Today the trees have grown again, but the "scar" most people see today is not actually the road but a line of large rocks with no trees 50–100 m above the road, provided as an easement for power lines. The road itself was opened on 23 January 1937, after two years of work, by Governor Sir Ernest Clark.

The road carries tourist traffic during the day, and sections may be closed at any time of the year due to snowfalls or icy conditions.  Halfway up this road (at 720 metres) is a picnic area called "The Springs", near the site of a chalet/health spa that was destroyed by bushfire in 1967.

Broadcast Tower
Mount Wellington was selected by many broadcasters as the site of radio and television transmitters as it provides line-of-sight transmission to a large area of Hobart and surrounding districts. 
A 60m steel lattice tower was constructed in 1960, surpassing the Taroona Shot Tower as the tallest structure in Tasmania. The first television stations to transmit from the mountain were TVT-6 (now WIN Television) and ABT-2 (the ABC) in 1960. Two main transmission towers located at its pinnacle; the concrete and steel BAI Communications tower (sometimes referred to as the NTA tower) and the other owned by WIN Television, of steel construction. The NTA tower broadcasts all of Hobart's high-power FM radio stations, plus the digital TV services for ABC and SBS. It also has a small accommodation area at its base, with a kitchen and workshop area. The WIN tower broadcasts the digital TV services for Southern Cross, WIN Television, and Tasmanian Digital Television. The site also contains a small kitchen area and contains some data links from local Hobart businesses. An amateur radio repeater is also installed on the mountain.

Erected in 1995, the current broadcast tower stands 130m tall. The site is considered one of the most inhospitable broadcasting sites in Australia with large incidence of strong winds which generally derive from the roaring forties that sweep the Southern Ocean from Africa.

Cable car proposals

An aerial cable car has been proposed for the mountain on four occasions. On 27 July 2022, the Hobart City Council rejected the planning application on 21 areas of non-compliance. The council received over 16,500 public submissions on the proposal, of which 70% were against it. The Mount Wellington Cableway Company (MWCC) then appealed to the Tasmanian Administrative Appeals Tribunal, which in November 2022 upheld the decision of the Hobart City Council, rejecting the proposal on 18 of 26 contested grounds of refusal. The MWCC has not submitted an appeal to the decision.

Climate
The summit of the mountain has a tundra climate (Koppen ET; Trewartha Fi) according to the standard Köppen–Geiger and Trewartha climate classification systems, as a maritime polar climate according to the Australian Bureau of Meteorology classification system.

Its record low temperature is  recorded on 3 September 1993, extreme for Australia and Tasmania though not especially so, lying outside the top 10 readings and top 7 locations for the state with its exposed, maritime aspect; its average yearly record low of around  places it within USDA hardiness zone 9a and Australian National Botanic Gardens hardiness zone 2.

The mountain significantly influences Hobart's weather, and intending visitors to the summit are advised to dress warmly against the often icy winds. In the winter it frequently snows and the mountain is often snowcapped. Lighter snowfalls in spring, summer and autumn are also common. A day on the summit can consist of clear sunny skies, then rain, snow, icy winds and clear again.

See also

 List of highest mountains of Tasmania

Notes

References

Further reading
 208 Network. (1994) Mt. Wellington – Mountain Park resource management plan and master plan for the Corporation of the City of Hobart : final draft for public comment : Hobart : 208 Network. "The 208 Network is John Hepper, Jerry de Gryse, with assistance from Chris Sharples, Fred and Diana Duncan, Robert Taylor, Hilary du Cros, Lindy Scripps, Greg Hodge".
 Curtis, Winifred M. (Winifred Mary) (n.d.) Forests and flowers of Mount Wellington, Tasmania  illustrated by D. Colbron Pearse. [Hobart]: Tasmanian Museum and Art Gallery.
 de Quincey, Elizabeth and Cannon, John (2005) The Companion to Tasmanian History p. 245 – entry "Mount Wellington"

 Barnes, Angus (1992), 'Mount Wellington and the sense of place', Honours thesis, University of Tasmania. https://eprints.utas.edu.au/31711/

External links

 Wellington Park official website

 
Wellington, Mount
Wellington, Mount
Mount Wellington
Mount Wellington
Mount Wellington
Jurassic Oceania